Blossom Damania is a virologist at the University of North Carolina at Chapel Hill. She is known for her work on oncogenic viruses that cause human cancer.
Damania has also been serving as vice dean for research at the UNC Chapel Hill School of Medicine since 2016.

Life and education
Damania received a Bachelor of Arts degree from Mount Holyoke College, MA in Biochemistry. She graduated summa cum laude from Mount Holyoke College. She also received a Doctor of Philosophy degree at the University of Pennsylvania in Cell and Molecular Biology in 1998.

Work
Damania was a postdoctoral fellow at Harvard Medical School, MA from 1998 to 2000 where she worked on herpesvirus biology. She received a postdoctoral fellowship from the Cancer Research Institute for this work.

In 2000, Damania started working as an assistant professor at the University of North Carolina at Chapel Hill in the School of Medicine. Damania is a member of the Department of Microbiology & Immunology and the Genetics Curriculum at the University of North Carolina at Chapel Hill. The Damania laboratory is located in the Lineberger Comprehensive Cancer Center at the University of North Carolina at Chapel Hill.

Damania was promoted to associate professor of microbiology and immunology in 2006 and full professor in 2011. She is currently the Cary C. Boshamer Distinguished Professor at the University of North Carolina at Chapel Hill. She is the co-leader of the virology program and co-director of the program in global oncology in the Lineberger Comprehensive Cancer Center. She served as assistant dean for research in the School of Medicine  and is currently vice dean for research in the School of Medicine at the University of North Carolina at Chapel Hill.

The Damania lab works at the intersection of viruses, cancer biology, and immunity. Damania has published over one hundred publications related to these scientific areas. Expertscape lists Damania as one of the topmost experts in the world on Kaposi sarcoma. 

Damania has been the recipient of numerous awards  as listed below:

V Foundation for Cancer Research Scholar Award, 

American Association for Cancer Research (AACR) Gertrude B. Elion Research Scholar,

American Herpes Foundation Research Scholar Award, 

Mary Lyon Alumnae Award, Mount Holyoke College, 

Leukemia & Lymphoma Society Scholar, 

Jefferson-Pilot Award in Faculty Medicine, 

American Heart Association Established Investigator Award, 

Burroughs Wellcome Investigator in Infectious Disease, 

Ruth and Phillip Hettleman Prize for Artistic and Scholarly Achievement, 

Dolph O. Adams Award from the Society for Leukocyte Biology. 

Damania is a Kavli Fellow of the National Academy of Sciences, USA, a Fellow of the American Academy of Microbiology, USA, and a Fellow of the American Association for the Advancement of Science (AAAS). In 2020, Damania was elected as Fellow of the American Academy of Arts and Sciences.

References

External links
Blossom Damania at UNC School of Medicine
Damania Laboratory can be found at  www.damania.org

Year of birth missing (living people)
Living people
American virologists
American women scientists
Mount Holyoke College alumni
University of North Carolina at Chapel Hill faculty
University of Pennsylvania alumni
Place of birth missing (living people)
Fellows of the American Academy of Microbiology
American women academics
21st-century American women